Norwich City Council is the city council for the city of Norwich, Norfolk, England. It consists of 39 councillors, elected to represent 13 wards, each with three councillors. It is currently under Labour control and led by Alan Waters. It forms the lower tier of local government in Norwich, responsible for local services such as housing, planning, leisure and tourism.

History

The council was established in 1974 following the implementation of the Local Government Act 1972, which replaced the county borough of Norwich. Since then the city has been governed by two tiers of local government. The upper tier is Norfolk County Council, which manages strategic services such as schools, social services and libraries across the county of Norfolk. The lower tier is Norwich City Council, which manages local services such as housing, planning, leisure and tourism.

In 2010 it was proposed to convert Norwich to a unitary authority, but this was blocked by the coalition government in 2010.

Composition

The current composition, following the 2022 City Council elections, is as follows:

In February 2010 the strength of parties on the council was: Labour Party 15, Green Party 13, Liberal Democrats 6 and Conservatives 5. The Labour Party formed a minority administration, holding all seats on the eight-member executive. Following the High Court decision that the order for a unitary council was unlawful, the 13 councillors who should have stood at the May election were told that they were no longer councillors. An election for these 13 seats was held on 9 September 2010. The Conservatives lost one seat to Labour, and the Liberal Democrats lost one seat to the Greens, resulting in a new council composition of 16 Labour, 14 Green, five Liberal Democrat and four Conservative. In the May 2014 council elections, 14 seats were contested. There was no change in seats compared to the previous council composition, with Labour retaining control of the council. Following the May 2014 election, the composition was: Labour Party 21, Green Party 15, Liberal Democrats 3.

Coat of arms

The city council's arms consist of a red shield featuring a silver-domed castle above a royal lion. The blazon of the arms is:

Gules, a castle triple-towered and domed Argent; in base a lion passant guardant Or.

The arms appeared on a 15th-century seal and were confirmed during a heraldic visitation in 1562 by William Harvey, Clarenceux King of Arms. According to Wilfrid Scott-Giles, the royal lion was said to have been granted by Edward III. By the 19th century the city corporation had added supporters to the arms—two angels—which were surmounted by a fur cap. These apparently originated in a carving of about 1534 outside Norwich Guildhall. A. C. Fox-Davies noted that "whether or not these figures were then intended for heraldic supporters is a matter for dispute. At any rate there is no official authority for their use". Following the abolition of the county borough of Norwich in 1974, an Order in Council transferred the ancient coat of arms (the shield alone) to the newly created city council. The city council has also received the grant of an heraldic badge, depicting the seal of 1404 encircled by the Lord Mayor's chain.

References

External links
Norwich City Council

 
Politics of Norwich
Non-metropolitan district councils of England
Councillors in Norfolk
Local authorities in Norfolk
Billing authorities in England
Leader and cabinet executives
1974 establishments in England